"After School" is a song recorded by South Korean girl group Weeekly. It was released on March 17, 2021, as the lead single from their third extended play We Play.

Composition 
"After School" was written by Seo Ji-eum and Seo Jeong-ah, composed by Daniel Durn, David Quinones, Denzil Remedios, Katrine Neya Klith Joergensen, Jazelle Paris, and Ryan S. Jhun, also arranged by Denzil Remedios and Ryan S. Jhun. Musically, the song was described as a "pop number mixed with reggae and trap beats" and an "impressive" song with "dynamic synthesizer and popping melody". Lyrically, it portrayed the "precious" time with friends after school. "After School" was composed in the key of C-sharp major, with a tempo of 164 beats per minute.

Commercial performance 
"After School" reached number 21 on the US Billboard World Digital Songs chart, also the group's first ever entry on the chart.

Promotion 
Weeekly promoted the single on several music programs starting from Mnet's M Countdown on March 18, 2021, KBS2's Music Bank on March 19, MBC's Show! Music Core on March 20, SBS's Inkigayo on March 21, SBS MTV's The Show on March 21, and Arirang TV's Simply K-Pop on March 29.

Accolades

Awards and nominations

Listicles

Charts

Release history

References 

2021 songs
2021 singles
Korean-language songs